The 2010 season was Haugesund's 2nd season in the Tippeligaen following their promotion in 2009, their 3rd season with Jostein Grindhaug as manager and 9th season in existence. They finished the season in 6th position, whilst also reaching the Fourth round of the Norwegian Cup.

Squad

Transfers

Winter

In:

Out:

Summer

In:

Out:

Competitions

Tippeligaen

Results summary

Results by round

Results

Table

Norwegian Cup

Squad statistics

Appearances and goals

|-
|colspan="14"|Players away from Haugesund on loan:
|-
|colspan="14"|Players who left Haugesund during the season:

|}

Goal scorers

Disciplinary record

References

FK Haugesund seasons
Haugesund